Anna Viktorovna Pyatykh (born April 4, 1981, in Moscow) is a professional Russian triple jumper. She has won the SPAR European Cup four consecutive times, won bronze medals at the 2005 World Championships in Helsinki and 2009 World Championships in Berlin. She has also competed at the 2004 Athens Olympics.

In 2006, she finished second at the 2006 IAAF World Indoor Championships behind countrywoman Tatyana Lebedeva.

She received a retrospective ban for doping after retest of her samples, resulting in the disqualification of her results at the IAAF World Championships in Osaka, Japan on 31 August 2007, and from 6 July 2013 to 15 December 2016.

International competitions

See also
List of doping cases in athletics
List of World Athletics Championships medalists (women)
List of European Athletics Championships medalists (women)
List of IAAF World Indoor Championships medalists (women)
Doping in Russia
Doping at the World Athletics Championships
Doping at the Olympic Games

References

1981 births
Living people
Athletes from Moscow
Russian female triple jumpers
Olympic female triple jumpers
Olympic athletes of Russia
Athletes (track and field) at the 2004 Summer Olympics
Athletes (track and field) at the 2008 Summer Olympics
World Athletics Championships athletes for Russia
World Athletics Championships medalists
World Athletics Indoor Championships medalists
European Athletics Championships medalists
Russian Athletics Championships winners
Doping cases in athletics
Russian sportspeople in doping cases